Madeleine Kelly (born December 28, 1995) is a Canadian track and field athlete specializing in the middle distance events.

Career
In July 2021, Kelly was named to Canada's 2020 Olympic team in the women's 800 metres. She placed fifth in her heat and did not advance to the semi-finals.

References

External links
 

1995 births
Living people
Canadian female track and field athletes
Athletes from Hamilton, Ontario
Athletes (track and field) at the 2020 Summer Olympics
Olympic track and field athletes of Canada
20th-century Canadian women
21st-century Canadian women